Winton is a locality near Benalla, Victoria, Australia. The town of Winton was proclaimed on 25 February 1861.

It is located in the Glenrowan wine region within 50 km of some of the wineries of North East Victoria, as well as being close to other local attractions including Glenrowan, the site of the famous Bushranger Ned Kelly's last stand. It is home to the Winton Motor Raceway.

It was named by district surveyor J.G.W. Wilmot, apparently after Winton, Cumbria, where he was said to have been born.

References

Towns in Victoria (Australia)
Rural City of Benalla
1861 establishments in Australia
Hume Highway